Chashma and Taunsa Barrage Dolphin Sanctuary is located in Mianwali District, Punjab, Pakistan. It was declared open to the public in 1972. Since the 1970s, the population of the Indus river dolphins has significantly increased there.a very important breeding, and wintering area for wide variety of waterfowl regularly 20000 birds it is the greatest preservation area for endangered indus dolphins.

The sanctuary has great potential for the development of eco-tourism in this part of Pakistan. Blind dolphins, an endemic species of the Indus River, can be observed here.

References

Wildlife sanctuaries in Punjab, Pakistan
Wildlife sanctuaries of Pakistan
Marine parks of Pakistan
Mianwali District
Protected areas of Punjab, Pakistan